Romanowo may refer to any of the following places in Poland:
Romanowo, Lower Silesian Voivodeship (south-west Poland)
Romanowo, Aleksandrów County in Kuyavian-Pomeranian Voivodeship (north-central Poland)
Romanowo, Bydgoszcz County in Kuyavian-Pomeranian Voivodeship (north-central Poland)
Romanowo, Podlaskie Voivodeship (north-east Poland)
Romanowo, Ciechanów County in Masovian Voivodeship (east-central Poland)
Romanowo, Maków County in Masovian Voivodeship (east-central Poland)
Romanowo, Gmina Sompolno in Greater Poland Voivodeship (west-central Poland)
Romanowo, Gmina Wierzbinek in Greater Poland Voivodeship (west-central Poland)
Romanowo, Środa Wielkopolska County in Greater Poland Voivodeship (west-central Poland)
Romanowo, Elbląg County in Warmian-Masurian Voivodeship (north Poland)
Romanowo, Ełk County in Warmian-Masurian Voivodeship (north Poland)